Portrait of a Noblewoman with an Attendant is an oil-on-canvas portrait by Peter Paul Rubens executed c. 1606. It probably shows Maria Grimaldi, daughter of Carlo Grimaldi, a marquess who in 1607 loaned his villa at Sampadierna to Rubens and his patron Vincenzo Gonzaga, Duke of Mantua. The attendant is probably a man with dwarfism, then a popular custom at European courts. The painting is now owned by the National Trust, being acquired in 1982 as part of their Kingston Lacy property.

External links
nationaltrustcollections.org.uk

1606 paintings
Portraits by Peter Paul Rubens
Noblewoman with a Dwarf
Paintings in Kingston Lacy